Provanna segonzaci is a species of sea snail, a marine gastropod mollusk in the family Provannidae.

Description

Distribution
This marine species occurs in hydrothermal vents off the Valufa Ridge, southeast of Fiji.

References

 Warén, A. & Bouchet, P. (1993). New records, species, genera, and a new family of gastropods from hydrothermal vents and hydrocarbon seeps. Zoologica Scripta. 22: 1-90.

External links
 Warén A. & Ponder W.F. (1991). New species, anatomy, and systematic position of the hydrothermal vent and hydrocarbon seep gastropod family Provannidae fam.n. (Caenogastropoda). Zoologica Scripta. 20(1): 27-56
 Warén A. & Bouchet P. (2001). Gastropoda and Monoplacophora from hydrothermal vents and seeps new taxa and records. The Veliger 44(2): 116–231

segonzaci
Gastropods described in 1991